The Amberg Wildlife Area (AWA) is a  tract of protected land located in Marinette County, Wisconsin, managed by the Wisconsin Department of Natural Resources (WDNR). The wildlife area is surrounded by other protected areas, operated by either the county or other WDNR lands. The property was established in 1948, primarily to protect rare swamp conifer land, made up of 90-100 year old white cedar. The wildlife area is split up into two land management areas, the  native community management area of the Amberg Swamp Conifers and the eponymous  habitat management area.

Land cover
Land to be used for the wildlife area was first acquired in 1948, to establish a protected habitat for deer. The AWA is included in the Northeast Sands property complex, which also includes the Pike Wild River complex, the Peshtigo River State Forest, and the Governor Thompson State Park. The Northeast Sands region is known for its extensive forest cover and high quality rivers.

Flora and fauna
There are multiple different species of trees that can be found in the wildlife area, most of which are native to Wisconsin. Notable examples include jack pine, black spruce, aspen, and northern pin oak. The area is home to large swathes of black ash trees, although the introduction of the emerald ash borer to the wider region has proved to be severely detrimental to the health of the black ash.

The AWA is encompassed within a larger habitat area, created specifically to address the conservation of birds. Notable or rare examples of birds that have been readily sighted in the area include the canada warbler, field sparrow, yellow-billed cuckoo, yellow-bellied flycatcher, and the wood thrush. In addition to birds, the area is home to a large number of deer and trout.

See also
 Governor Thompson State Park
 Peshtigo River State Forest

References

External links
 U.S. Geological Survey Map at the U.S. Geological Survey Map Website. Retrieved August 26, 2022.

State Wildlife Areas of Wisconsin
Protected areas of Wisconsin
Geography of Marinette County, Wisconsin
Protected areas established in 1948